Liudmila Samsonova defeated Aliaksandra Sasnovich in the final, 6–1, 6–3 to win the singles tennis title at the 2022 Tennis in the Land. It was Samsonova's third career WTA Tour title, and she won the title without dropping a set. It was also her second straight title, following Washington three weeks prior.

Anett Kontaveit was the reigning champion, but did not participate.

Seeds

Draw

Finals

Top half

Bottom half

Qualifying

Seeds

Qualifiers

Lucky losers

Qualifying draw

First qualifier

Second qualifier

Third qualifier

Fourth qualifier

References

External links
Main draw
Qualifying draw

Tennis in the Land - Singles
Tennis in Cleveland